Roots, Volume 1 is the fifty-third studio album by American country singer Merle Haggard, released in 2001. It reached Number 47 on the Billboard Country Albums chart.

Background
After the success of Haggard's If I Could Only Fly, his first album for the independent label ANTI-, he followed with another successful recording with Norman Stephens, the guitarist for Lefty Frizzell, one of Haggard's major influences. Five of the album's tracks were written by Frizzell, but also pays tribute to Hank Williams and Hank Thompson. Haggard also contributes the original composition "More Than My Old Guitar."

Reception

In his Allmusic review, critic Stephen Thomas Erlewine called Roots, Volume 1 an "unexpected return to how country records used to be made" and "an album filled with small gems, but they add up to a large triumph–a rich, masterful album that's not just the best country album of 2001, but one of Haggard's finest moments."

Track listing 
"Always Late with Your Kisses" (Lefty Frizzell, Blackie Crawford) – 3:14
"More Than My Old Guitar" (Merle Haggard) – 3:28
"If You've Got the Money I've Got the Time" (Frizzell, Jim Beck) – 3:02
"Look What Thoughts Will Do" (Jim Beck, Little Jimmy Dickens, Dub Dickerson, Frizzell, Richard Duncan James) – 2:28
"My Baby's Just Like Money" (Frizzell) – 2:27
"Honky Tonkin'" (Hank Williams) – 2:51
"Runaway Mama" (Haggard) – 4:08
"I'll Sign My Heart Away" (Hank Thompson) – 2:29
"I've Got a Tender Heart" (Haggard) – 2:21
"The Wild Side of Life" (Arlie Carter, William Warren) – 2:42
"Take These Chains from My Heart" (Fred Rose, Hy Heath) – 2:42
"I Want to Be with You Always" (Frizzell, Beck) – 3:00

Personnel
Merle Haggard – vocals, guitar
Norm Hamlet – steel guitar
Theresa Lane Haggard – background vocals, percussion
Abe Manuel, Jr. – fiddle, mandolin, background vocals
Billy McGill – guitar
Chester Smith – guitar
Norman Stephens – guitar
Redd Volkaert – guitar
Doug Colosio – piano
Eddie Curtis – bass
Johnnie Barber – drums
Brooks Liggatt – drums
Production notes:
Merle Haggard – producer
Lou Bradley – engineer
Bob McGill – engineer
Doug Sax – mastering
Robert Hadley – mastering
Jesse Fischer – art direction, design
Piper Ferguson – photography
Johnny Whiteside – liner notes

Chart performance

References

2001 albums
Merle Haggard albums
Anti- (record label) albums